I Love New York (season 1) is first season of the VH1 reality television series entitled I Love New York. The first season consisted of 12 episodes, which first aired weekly from January 8, 2007 to April 15, 2007.

Production
In July 2006, VH1 published a casting call looking for contestants for their new series tentatively titled The Flavorette. Various blogs speculated that the star of this program could be Flavor of Love season one contestants "Rain" (Thela Brown), "Hoopz" (Nicole Alexander) or Pollard. Before the second season finale of Flavor of Love, Pollard denied having her own show but when the Flavor of Love season 2 finale aired, she confirmed she was the "Flavorette" and that she was already down to the final three contestants.

On November 3, 2006, VH1 announced the show's official title: I Love New York. The first commercial for the series aired on December 3, 2006 during the VH1 2006 Big Awards show. The show premiered on Monday, January 8, 2007 and is the most watched series debut in VH1 history.

Contestants

 Left in episode 3 due to mental distress.

Elimination order

Episode 10 was a clip show
Episode 8 New York eliminated Whiteboy, no chains were handed out and the remaining contestants' names are listed in alphabetical order. 

 The contestant won the competition.
 The contestant voluntarily withdrew from the competition.
 The contestant was eliminated.

The following numbers indicate which type of date the contestant won:
1 The contestant won a group date with New York. On Episode 9, New York has a date with Tango, and another with Real and Chance. Their parents joined their sons on dates.
2 The contestant won a solo date with New York.

DVD release
The complete first season DVD was released October 2, 2007 for publicity for the second season. It contains all eleven episodes including the reunion special. An Australian DVD was released on November 1, 2008.

After the show
12 Pack (David Amerman), Heat (Jason Rosell), Chance (Kamal Givens), Real (Ahmad Givens), Mr. Boston (Lee Marks) and Whiteboy (Joshua Gallander) appeared on the first season of I Love Money.
Bonez (Kevin Peters), Heat (Jason Rosell), Onix (William Lash), and T-Weed (Kevin Watson) appeared on the second season of I Love Money.
 12 pack later appeared on Daisy of Love.
 Jason Rosell ("Heat") has appeared on Gilmore Girls, also competed in I Love Money 1 and 2, as well as appearing in several movies and currently working on a 2011 film.
Mr. Boston (Lee Marks) made a guest appearance on I Love New York 2 and New York Goes to Work.
Real (Ahmad Givens) and Chance (Kamal Givens) made a guest appearance on I Love New York 2. The duo later appeared on their own VH1 dating game show entitled Real Chance of Love.
 T-Weed (Kevin Watson) appeared in several films.
Rico (Sandro Padrone) has starred in several pornographic videos under the alias "Marco Rivera". He also appeared on an episode of Judge Joe Brown where he was ordered to pay his roommate (who claimed Padrone had stiffed him on rent for their Hollywood apartment) $3,130.
Bonez (Keven Peters) was a contestant on an episode of Excused he was the last man standing out of all the three rounds of men who came to the door and in the end was Excused.
 On February 20, 2015, Real (Ahmad Givens) died after his battle with stage 4 colon cancer at the age of 35.
 Chance (Kamal Givens) received a new dating show called One Mo' Chance on the Zeus Network

References

External links
I Love New York at VH1.com

2007 American television seasons